Vranduk is an historic village in the municipality of Zenica, Bosnia and Herzegovina.

Geography
It is situated on the Bosna River canyon, just downstream from city of Zenica, at the site called the Vranduk Pass. The main road Sarajevo-Zenica-Doboj (M17) passes through the canyon and the village. On 14 February 1971 a rail crash in the tunnel near Vranduk occurred, 34 people were killed and 113 (60 serious) injured.

History

Archaeological excavations to date on the site of the fort showed no signs of fortifications dating from the prehistoric period or antiquity, or prior to the medieval times. The village itself is one of the oldest and well preserved settlements of Bosnia and Herzegovina, dating back to the 14th century and times of medieval bans and later kings of Bosnia. Vranduk village was established around a medieval citadel of the same name, and together constitute a protected architectural assembly, and as such it is a national monument of Bosnia and Herzegovina, well preserved and maintained in good condition by local and state commissions for national monuments, and managed by a local tourist organization. A small mosque was erected below the citadel after the Ottoman conquest of the Bosnian Kingdom which still is standing today in good condition. The mosque was dedicated to and named after Sultan Mehmed II, conqueror of Bosnia, and is also referred to as the Imperial Mosque or Emperor's Mosque. In 1963, excavations were undertaken by Branka Raunig to explore the impact of the Roman empire on the village.

Demographics 
According to the 2013 census, its population was 447.

Gallery

References

External links
 Historvius - Vranduk, Bosnia and Herzegovina ˙(History and Visitor Information)
 Ecoplan | Management Plan for conservation of the national monument Stari grad Vranduk
 Vranduk from air (Video 3 min. 21 sec. long)

Populated places in Zenica
National Monuments of Bosnia and Herzegovina
Protected areas of Bosnia and Herzegovina
Villages in the Federation of Bosnia and Herzegovina
Architecture in Bosnia and Herzegovina
Medieval architecture
Ottoman architecture in Bosnia and Herzegovina
Islamic architecture
Medieval Bosnia and Herzegovina architecture